Catunaregam is a genus of flowering plants in the family Rubiaceae, native to tropical Africa and tropical Southeast Asia.

Species
Catunaregam longispina (Link) Tirveng. - India, Bangladesh, Bhutan, Burma, Thailand, Vietnam 
Catunaregam nilotica (Stapf) Tirveng. - Guinea, Nigeria, Central African Republic, Cameroon, Chad, Eritrea, Ethiopia, Somalia, Sudan, Kenya, Tanzania, Uganda 
Catunaregam nutans (Roxb.) Tirveng. - India, Assam
Catunaregam obovata (Hochst.) A.E.Gonç. - Mozambique, KwaZulu-Natal, Eswatini
Catunaregam oocarpa (Ridl.) Tirveng. - Thailand, Malaysia, Sumatra 
Catunaregam pentandra (Gürke) Bridson - Tanzania, Malawi, Mozambique, Zimbabwe 
Catunaregam pygmaea Vollesen - Tanzania
Catunaregam spinosa (Thunb.) Tirveng. - China, Taiwan, Bangladesh, India, Bhutan, Pakistan, Sri Lanka, Cambodia, Laos, Burma, Thailand, Vietnam, Java, Malaysia 
Catunaregam stenocarpa Bridson - Mozambique
Catunaregam swynnertonii (S.Moore) Bridson - Mozambique, Zimbabwe 
Catunaregam taylorii (S.Moore) Bridson - D.R.Congo, Tanzania, Malawi, Zambia, Zimbabwe, Eswatini, Transvaal 
Catunaregam tomentosa (Blume ex DC.) Tirveng.

References

External links
Catunaregam in the World Checklist of Rubiaceae

Rubiaceae genera
Gardenieae